The Aotearoa Music Awards are awarded in several different categories. As of 2014, the awards are presented in 31 categories, and have been hosted annually since 1965.

Current awards

Past awards

Aotearoa Music Awards